Audrey Vernick is an American picture-book author—whose works include many featuring lesser-known figures in baseball history, including Larry Doby, Edith Houghton, Effa Manley, Max Patkin, and the Acerra brothers—and children's novelist.

Awards

 California Young Reader Medal (2015 for Brothers at Bat, illustrated by Steven Salerno)
 Amelia Bloomer Book (2017, for The Kid From Diamond Street)

References

Living people
American children's writers
21st-century American women writers
American women children's writers
Year of birth missing (living people)